Everett Station is an Amtrak train station serving the city of Everett, Washington. The station has provided service to the Cascades and Empire Builder routes since its opening in 2002, replacing an earlier station near the Port of Everett. The four-story building also houses social service programs and is the center of a  complex that includes parking lots and a large bus station used primarily by Community Transit, Everett Transit, and Sound Transit Express. The station has served as the northern terminus of the Sounder N Line since 2003 and the Swift Blue Line since 2009. It consists of two side platforms, one serving Amtrak and the other serving Sounder commuter trains. Everett Station also functions as a park and ride, with 1,067 short-term parking spaces located in lots around the station after it was expanded by Sound Transit in 2009.

Services

Everett Station is served by six daily Amtrak trains: four Cascades runs between Seattle and Vancouver, British Columbia, and two Empire Builder runs between Seattle and Chicago. The station is also served by the N Line of Sound Transit's Sounder commuter rail service, running four trains in peak direction towards King Street Station in Seattle during the morning commute and four trains from Seattle during the evening commute, only on weekdays and during special events. Train service to Everett is most often disrupted and canceled during the autumn and winter seasons because of landslides along the shoreline of the Puget Sound, where the BNSF mainline tracks run. During the 2012–2013 winter season, a record-high of 206 passenger trains between Everett and Seattle were canceled, prompting the Washington State Department of Transportation to begin a three-year landslide mitigation project in 2013 that will stabilize slopes above the railroad between Seattle and Everett.

The Everett Station complex also includes a bus station with 26 bus bays that serve as a major transfer station for routes from Snohomish County. Everett Transit operates the majority of its bus routes out of their 12 bus bays on Smith Avenue. Community Transit has six routes at the station, serving as the terminus for local service from Smokey Point, Marysville, Snohomish, Lake Stevens, and Monroe; CT also debuted their Swift Blue Line bus rapid transit service in 2009, with Everett Station as the northern terminus of the route along the Highway 99 corridor to Shoreline. Sound Transit runs three of its ST Express bus routes out of Everett Station, with peak-only, limited-stop service to Seattle and Bellevue, as well as all-day service to Seattle via Lynnwood Transit Center, along Interstate 5 and Interstate 405. Skagit Transit runs a weekday inter-county express route (Route 90X) from the station to Skagit Station in Mount Vernon and Chuckanut Park & Ride in Burlington; Island Transit also runs a peak-only weekday express route (Route 412C) from Everett Station to Stanwood and Camano Island. Paratransit to the front door of the station building is provided by Community Transit and Everett Station through the Dial a Ride program.

Daily intercity bus service to Everett Station is provided by Greyhound Lines and Northwestern Trailways. In March 2019, Greyhound's BoltBus express service began serving Everett Station with 48 departures to Vancouver, Bellingham, Tacoma, and Portland, Oregon. The service was discontinued by Greyhound in 2021.

Station layout

The Everett Station complex is located on  situated between Downtown Everett to the west and Interstate 5 to the east. The train platforms are located on the east side of the station building and bus bays, along three BNSF-owned railway tracks. The covered west platform, used by the Sounder commuter rail service, is located directly east of the station building, while a partially sheltered platform, used by Amtrak, is situated on the second set of tracks and is accessible by several pedestrian at-grade crossings. Directly south of the main building are the bus bays, which are centered around a covered walkway that connects the train platforms to the Swift bus rapid transit station, served by the Blue Line. 1,067 short-term parking spaces are located around the station complex, including the initial parking lot west of the tracks and an additional parking lot accessible by a pedestrian bridge over the tracks. In addition to the short-term parking lots, there are 25 designated Amtrak/Greyhound parking stalls and eight rideshare vehicles stalls located at the front of the station building.

Station building

The station building is a four-floor brick-and-glass structure housing  that includes ticketing offices, a waiting area, classrooms, and community rooms. The front façade mainly comprises a three-story glass wall inside of a  precast steel arch, facing a small plaza at the intersection of Smith Avenue and 32nd Street. The lobby is decorated with an inlaid terrazzo floor with a design representing local waterways, accompanied by a three-story atrium consisting of a large glass wall and a large clock. The station building, designed by architectural firm Zimmer Gunsul Frasca Partnership, houses ticket counters and waiting areas for Amtrak and Greyhound in addition to passenger amenities, such as restrooms, payphones, a customer service center, and ORCA card vending machines, open daily from 6am to 10pm. The station has weatherproof bicycle lockers in addition to 6 short-term bicycle racks located at the front of the station.

In addition to being a multimodal hub for train and bus service, Everett Station functions as a home to social services and educational programs. University Center of North Puget Sound was formerly located on the 2nd floor of the station building, providing baccalaureate and graduate degrees through local universities and colleges until it moved to the campus of Everett Community College in 2010. The Everett branches of WorkForce and WorkSource, public employment services operated by the Washington State Employment Security Department that provide career development training and job placement assistance to unemployed, are located on the 3rd and 4th floors, respectively. The 4th floor is also home to the Weyerhaeuser Room, a  public meeting space, named for the philanthropic arm of the Weyerhaeuser Company in 2003 after their donation of murals displayed throughout Everett Station.

The first floor is planned to be occupied by the Bezos Academy, a private tuition-free preschool funded by Amazon founder Jeff Bezos. It is planned to open in late 2022 with three classrooms, a kitchen, and an outdoor play area in a former parking lot. A ten-year lease for the  space was approved by the Everett City Council in January for $1 per month.

Awards and recognition

The City of Everett and ZGF Partnership were recognized by the Puget Sound Regional Council with a "Vision 2020" award for its combination of a transportation hub and community gathering place into a single project. Everett Station also won the 2006 Citation Award from the Washington branch of the American Institute of Architects, whose jury commended the City of Everett on the station housing "an innovative mix of transit, educational functions, and community spaces; delights travelers; and is welcoming to the public for classes, public meetings, and banquets."

History

Prior to the opening of Everett Station in 2002, Amtrak served the city of Everett at a small station located at 2900 Bond Street, overlooking the Port of Everett west of downtown. It saw free commuter rail service from January to March 1995 as part of the "Try Rail" demonstration, consisting of two daily roundtrips from Seattle and special service to Seattle SuperSonics games at the Tacoma Dome. The Bond Street Station, originally built by the Great Northern Railway in 1910, was originally planned to be kept as a secondary commuter rail station without parking or major bus connections until it was removed from Sound Transit's plans in 2001. The station was closed in November 2002 and has since become the offices of the BNSF Railway Northwest Division.

The City of Everett selected a straightaway track segment east of downtown as the preferred location of a multimodal train/bus station, to replace the existing Amtrak station at Bond Street, in 1993. The Everett City Council chose a two-block industrial site bordered by Pacific Avenue to the north in 1995, estimating a cost of $30 million and an opening in 1998. Everett Mayor Ed Hansen proposed adding two additional stories to the station building to house classrooms and space for career counseling services, inspired by a similar project in Oakland, California. The Sound Transit Board passed a resolution in February 1999 allowing the use of $14 million to begin work on the Everett Multimodal Facility, which was to be the terminus for Sounder commuter rail and Sound Transit Express bus service. A groundbreaking ceremony was held on July 13, 2000, allowing for construction on Everett Station to begin. Sound Transit began with the construction of the Pacific Avenue overpass, replacing an earlier at-grade crossing, that opened on November 14, 2001 at a cost of $20 million. The station building was designed by the Zimmer Gunsul Frasca Partnership and built by Wilder Construction Company in 2000 and 2001.

The $46.9 million station was opened during a ribbon-cutting ceremony on February 4, 2002, attended by Everett Mayor Ed Hansen, Governor Gary Locke, U.S. Representative Rick Larsen, Snohomish County Executive Bob Drewel and Sound Transit Board chairman and King County Executive Ron Sims. Initially, only Everett Transit and Community Transit operated out of the station on opening day, but they were quickly joined by Sound Transit Express service the following day and Greyhound intercity bus service that summer. Amtrak was initially expected to begin serving Everett Station in July 2002, but the construction of a passing track delayed the move of the Cascades and Empire Builder from Bond Street Station to November 12. Construction of a Sounder commuter rail platform and rail spur was approved by the Everett City Council in September 2002, pending reimbursement from Sound Transit and Amtrak for its cost of $726,000. Sounder service to King Street Station in Seattle via Edmonds began with special Seattle Seahawks gameday service on December 22, 2003, carrying 700 passengers on the inaugural run of the Sounder North Line (now the N Line).

Sound Transit expanded parking capacity at Everett Station to 1,067 spaces with the addition of 440 stalls, located east of the station and connected via a pedestrian overpass, that opened in May 2009 at a cost of $13.6 million. The southern lot of the station was cleared to build the terminus of Community Transit's Swift Bus Rapid Transit Blue Line, which began service on November 29, 2009, connecting Everett to Shoreline via the State Route 99 corridor.

Everett Station was proposed as the site of a University of Washington branch campus, with state consultants choosing  around the station to house 5,000 students from Snohomish, Island County and Skagit County. The project, dubbed UW North Sound, was put on hold in December 2008 and has since been canceled. Another proposal would have a 500-stall parking garage built to replace the southernmost lot at a cost of $15–18 million, allowing Everett Transit to transform the existing western lot into mixed-use development.

References

External links

City of Everett
Sound Transit Rider Guide

Amtrak stations in Washington (state)
Sounder commuter rail stations
Bus stations in Washington (state)
Transit centers in the United States
Buildings and structures in Everett, Washington
Railway stations in the United States opened in 2002
Transportation buildings and structures in Snohomish County, Washington
2002 establishments in Washington (state)
Sound Transit Express
Proposed Link light rail stations